This is the discography of American heavy metal band W.A.S.P.

Albums

Studio albums

Live albums

Compilation albums

Video albums

Singles

References

Discographies of American artists
Heavy metal discographies
Rock music group discographies